Haim Ben-Shahar (חיים בן שחר) (born c.1935) is an Israeli economist, and former President of Tel Aviv University.

Biography
Ben-Shahar was born in Israel. He earned a Ph.D. in Banking and Finance from New York University.

He is an economist and taught economics at Tel Aviv University. From 1972 to 1975 Ben-Shahar was Dean of the university's Social Sciences faculty. 

Ben-Shahar was President of Tel Aviv University from 1977 to 1983. He succeeded Professor Yuval Ne'eman as President, and was in turn succeeded by Moshe Many.

References 

Presidents of universities in Israel
Israeli economists
Academic staff of Tel Aviv University
New York University alumni
Possibly living people
1930s births